Terre del Reno is a new comune (municipality) in the Province of Ferrara in the Italian region Emilia-Romagna. As of 1 January 2017, it has a population of 10.041.

Terre del Reno borders the following municipalities: Bondeno, Cento, Galliera, Pieve di Cento (BO), Poggio Renatico, Vigarano Mainarda.

The new municipality, from 1 January 2017, was made from the union of Mirabello and Sant'Agostino.

References

Cities and towns in Emilia-Romagna